Xavier High School is an all-boys college preparatory Catholic high school in Middletown, Connecticut, United States. It is run by the Xaverian Brothers. Teenage boys from over 65 towns surrounding and including  Middletown attend Xavier; despite the fact that students commute from a very broad area all students, their parents, faculty, and staff, regardless of how far away they live from the school, are referred to by Xavier officials as "The Xavier Community".

Xavier is sponsored jointly by the Roman Catholic Diocese of Norwich and the Congregation of the Brothers of Saint Francis Xavier. The school was incorporated under the laws of the State of Connecticut on February 18, 1963.

Administration and academics
Xavier High School is run day-to-day on a Headmaster-Principal model. Xavier draws a diverse student body from 60 different towns across Connecticut and internationally. Xavier offers Advanced Placement courses as well as thirteen courses that qualify students to earn college credit at UConn and other universities.

Sports
Xavier has athletic teams in 20 different sports.  They compete in the Southern Connecticut Conference (SCC) of the Connecticut Interscholastic Athletic Conference (CIAC).

Athletic highlights

Xavier's ultimate frisbee team won back to back New England championships in 2011 and 2012. The Falcons' opponent in the championship game in 2012 was none other than Middletown High School which is located in the same town as Xavier.

Xavier's football team won the Class LL state championship in 2005, 2010, 2011, 2012 and again in 2014. The team has also celebrated a number of division championships in the SCC, including 2000, 2004, 2005, 2009, 2010, 2011, and in 2012.  The team has also had several undefeated seasons including 1971, 1972, 1974, 2005, 2010 and 2011.

Xavier's golf team won the Division 1 State Championship in 2017. The Falcons shot 301 winning the program's first state title.

Xavier's sailing team won Connecticut State Championships in 2004 and 2006, and placed 7th at the New England Championships in both team and fleet racing in 2006.

Xavier's Cross Country team holds the most state titles out of any sport at the school, winning its latest in 2021. In 2017 they won their 6th New England Championship and progressed to the Nike Cross Nationals, placing 18th out of 22 teams there.

Xavier's 4x1 mile relay team placed 6th place in the nation in the Nike Indoor National Championships in March 2007.

Xavier's outdoor track team has had many all-Americans and two national champions, most recently Robbie Cozean in the 5,000 meters in 2019. That same year their distance medley relay team placed 2nd at the New Balance Outdoor Nationals.

Xavier's soccer team won the State Championship in 1995. They have also won a number of division and conference championships over the years, the most recent in 2021 (both division and conference champions).

Xavier's Wrestling team won three state championships in 2011, 2012, and 2020 with the 2012 being declared the #1 wrestling team in the state of Connecticut, under head coach Michael Cunningham.  The team also has a number of individual awards including 3 New England Champions, 8 state open Championships, and 24 State Champions.

XSN (Xavier Streaming Network) was created in 2013 to help stream and showcase as many of these games and other streaming events over the years.  The club is entirely student-ran for students who have an interest in broadcasting or streaming.  In their time, the club has streamed many different events for Xavier including home basketball games, football games, soccer games, and even Xavier masses and concerts for the school over the past few years.

Technology
Xavier participates in a "BYOD" Bring your Own Device" Program, which allows students to bring their own laptop and integrate technology into their classroom experience.

Notable alumni

Michael Aresco ('68) - broadcasting executive and Commissioner of the American Athletic Conference
Jeff Bagwell ('86) - Baseball Hall of Fame Class of 2017 Houston Astros
Thom Brooks ('92) - political philosopher and legal scholar
Nick Greenwood ('05) - Former pitcher for the St. Louis Cardinals 
Will Tye ('10) - Former NFL tight end for the New York Giants
Amari Spievey ('06) - Former NFL safety for the Detroit Lions
Ryan Preece ('09) - Stock car driver in the NASCAR Whelen Modified Tour, the NASCAR Camping World Truck Series, the NASCAR Xfinity Series and the NASCAR Cup Series
Tim Boyle ('13) - Quarterback for the Detroit Lions
Will Levis ('18) - Quarterback for the University of Kentucky
Kevin Lacz ('00) - Navy SEAL and Author of The Last Punisher

Scholarships
Students are eligible for scholarships based on their academic achievements. In addition, over $1 million per year in financial aid and tuition assistance is provided to students who qualify.

See also
Other boys' schools in Connecticut:
 Fairfield College Preparatory School
 Notre Dame High School (West Haven, Connecticut)

References

External links
 
 Roman Catholic Diocese of Norwich

Buildings and structures in Middletown, Connecticut
Schools in Middlesex County, Connecticut
Catholic secondary schools in Connecticut
Schools sponsored by the Xaverian Brothers
Boys' schools in the United States
Educational institutions established in 1963
1963 establishments in Connecticut